Enthetica is a genus of moth in the family Lecithoceridae.

Species
 Enthetica picryntis Meyrick, 1916
 Enthetica tribrachia Meyrick, 1923

References

Natural History Museum Lepidoptera genus database

Lecithoceridae